There are a number of settlements named Knightstown:

 Knightstown, County Kerry, the principal settlement on Valentia Island, Ireland
 Knightstown, Indiana, United States